People's Republic of China first competed at the Asian Games in 1974.

China has led the gold medal count in each Asian Games since 1982.

Asian Games

*Red border color indicates tournament was held on home soil.

Medals by Games

Medals by Summer Sport

Medals by individual

Asian Winter Games

*Red border color indicates tournament was held on home soil.

Medals by Games

Asian Para Games

*Red border color indicates tournament was held on home soil.

Medals by Games

Asian Beach Games

*Red border color indicates tournament was held on home soil.

Medals by Games

Asian Indoor and Martial Arts Games

Medals by Games

Asian Youth Games

*Red border color indicates tournament was held on home soil.

Medals by Games

Asian Youth Para Games

Medals by Games

East Asian Games

*Red border color indicates tournament was held on home soil.

Medals by Games

Doping

Systematic doping of Chinese athletes in Olympic Games (and other international sport events) revealed by Xue Yinxian in 2012 and 2017. He claimed more than 10,000 athletes in China were doped in the systematic Chinese government doping program and that they received performance enhancing drugs in the 1980s and 1990s. He stated that all international medals (Both in the Olympics and other international competitions) that were won by Chinese athletes in the 1980s and 1990s (1980 to 2000) should be taken back. This is contrary to previous statements made by the Chinese government that denied involvement in systematic doping, claiming that athletes doped individually. The International Olympic Committee and World Anti-Doping Agency investigated these allegations with no conclusions given.

Medals by Asian Games in 1980 to 2000

Medals by Summer Games

Medals by Winter Games

Disqualified Medalists

See also
 China at the Olympics
 Sports in China

References